Monsieur Pointu is a 1975 animated film about Quebec fiddler Monsieur Pointu, the stage name for Paul Cormier.

Synoposis
In this 12-and-a-half-minute film, Pointu and his violin break into pieces that take on a life of their own, dancing to the artist's music.

Production
The film was directed by Bernard Longpré and André Leduc and produced by René Jodoin for the National Film Board of Canada. Monsieur Pointu makes use of the pixillation technique pioneered by NFB animation studio founder Norman McLaren in Neighbours and A Chairy Tale, combined with optical effects.

Critical reception
Monsieur Pointu was screened at the 1978 Festival of Animated Films in Ottawa. It was nominated for an Academy Award for Best Animated Short Film at the 48th Academy Awards.

References

External links
Watch Monsieur Pointu, National Film Board of Canada (Requires Adobe Flash)

1975 films
National Film Board of Canada animated short films
Pixilation films
Animated films without speech
Quebec films
1970s stop-motion animated films
Quebec music
Fictional violinists
1970s animated short films
1975 animated films
1975 short films
1970s Canadian films